Kniseh (also Romanized Kanisah, Keniseh) is a village in the  Tyre District,  South Governorate of Lebanon, 10 km southeast of Tyre. Kniseh's most prominent family is Souwaydan  and it is birthplace of Layal Abboud.

References

External links
Kneisseh (Tyr), localiban

Populated places in Tyre District